Here is the list of all the collaborations of Filipino musical artist Johnny Alegre with other artists in other albums.

This list will expand over time.

As producer

Albums

Singles

As arranger

As instrumentalist

As composer 
Here is a partial list of musical compositions contributed by Johnny Alegre to other artists.

References

Filipino jazz composers
Filipino jazz musicians
Filipino record producers